Ralph Arthur Roberts (born Robert Arthur Schönherr; 2 October 1884 – 12 March 1940) was a German film actor who also directed in the theatre and occasionally in film and wrote plays. From 1928 on, he headed the Berlin Theatre in Behrenstraße.

Life and career
He was born in Meerane as Robert Arthur Schönherr to Carl Robert Schönherr, a baker, and Berta Elisabeth ( König). He grew up in Dresden, where he was already performing as an extra at the Albert-Theater while still in gymnasium and then studied acting with Adolf Winds and composition at the conservatoire. He made his professional début in 1903 at the Residenztheater in Wiesbaden, and had temporary engagements at the Trianon Theatre in Berlin and the Schauspielhaus in Breslau. In 1907 or earlier, he moved to Hamburg, where in 1909 he became a member of the company at the Thalia Theatre.

After service as an officer in World War I, Roberts returned to the Thalia, where he directed plays in addition to acting. In 1921 he became head of the Komödienhaus in Berlin, and in 1928 he opened his own theatre in Behrenstraße, where he premiėred several comic works of his own. Initially he played tragicomic rôles, frequently in operettas; in 1922, he co-starred with Fritzi Massary in the première of Leo Fall's Madame Pompadour. However, after that he concentrated on light comedy on the stage.

In addition, he played several supporting rôles in films. Wearing a monocle was part of his image, and in film he generally played men of substance: directors and industrialists.

Roberts also wrote lyrics for songs, which were used for the 1954 film On the Reeperbahn at Half Past Midnight featuring Hans Albers and Heinz Rühmann. In particular, he wrote both the lyrics and the music for the title waltz, originally for a 1912 revue of his at the Thalia, Bunt ist die Welt, and also prominently featured in the film Große Freiheit Nr. 7 from 1944.

He died in Berlin on 12 March 1940, before the première of his last film, Wie konntest Du, Veronika!, from oyster poisoning, and was buried at the Protestant Südwestkirchhof in Stahnsdorf.

Filmography

Actor

Direction and scriptwriting
1934: Playing with Fire (Director, co-scripted)
1939: Meine Tante – Deine Tante (Co-scripted, also actor)
1949/50: Sie sind nicht mehr (Assistant director)
1957/58: Das gab's nur einmal (Assistant director)

Lyrics and music
1954: Auf der Reeperbahn nachts um halb eins (Lyrics, music)

References

Further reading
 Hansjoachim Schönherr. Ralph Arthur Roberts, Lebensbild eines großen Schauspielers. Studien zur Filmgeschichte 7. Hildesheim/New York: Olms, 1992.

External links
 
 Ralph Arthur Roberts at Virtual History

1884 births
1940 deaths
People from Meerane
People from the Kingdom of Saxony
German male film actors
German male silent film actors
20th-century German male actors